St. Ambrose Academy is a Roman Catholic elementary school and high school located on the west side of Madison, Wisconsin. Founded in 2003, the school's stated purpose is to offer "a classical education rooted in the Catholic faith."

History

Established in 2003, with classrooms at a facility of Cardinal Stritch University in Madison, by 2004 the school had 14 students. That year the Madison Plan Commission granted a conditional use permit to St. Thomas Aquinas parish at 602 Everglade Drive for up to 60 students.  The school operated in the religious education wing of St. Thomas Aquinas parish until 2021.

Scott Schmiesing became principal of St. Ambrose Academy in July, 2008 and continues in this role. In 2009, the school was accredited by NAPC*IS, the National Association of Private Catholic* and Independent Schools. In 2010, the City of Madison Plan Commission approved enrollment of up to 140 at the school's St. Thomas Aquinas Parish quarters. 
As enrollment growth continued, school leadership looked for alternative sites into which the school could move and expand. In 2018, plans were announced to build or move to a new school building. It was later announced that a new campus would be built on a site located in Fitchburg. The Christ Our Light building campaign began in late 2018 with the goal of raising funds necessary for a complete campus to serve existing families and future enrollment projections.

After the County health office on August 21, 2020, ordered St. Ambrose Academy and all county schools to close in-person instruction in grades 3-12 effective August 24, 2020, the school joined with a number of Dane County parochial schools in demanding that the county revoke the emergency order August 28, 2020, on the grounds that the order was unconstitutional and unlawful. On August 28, 2020 the school was joined by seven Dane County parochial schools in filing an original action in the Wisconsin Supreme Court challenging the County health office's emergency order on religious liberty grounds and as lacking statutory authority. The school launched a crowdfunding website which raised over $100,000 within days to cover anticipated legal fees. On September 10, 2020, the Wisconsin Supreme Court temporarily enjoined Dane County from closing schools. On June 11, 2021, the Wisconsin Supreme Court vacated those portions of the Dane County Order "restricting or prohibiting -in-person instruction." The court held that "local health officers do not have the statutory power to close schools" and that an Order attempting to close religious schools "infringes the Petitioners' fundamental right to the free exercise of religion guaranteed under Article I, Section 18 of the Wisconsin Constitution...."

Curriculum
The six core subjects are English, history, Latin, math, religion, and science. Topical studies that follow a historical progression are taught in a four-year cycle for the senior high and a three-year cycle for the junior high. Each cycle's historical topic is integrated in history, English, and religion, with the other courses reinforcing these studies where possible, yielding a "unified and interdisciplinary approach to each historical period." High school students are required to take two years of Latin.

Religion instruction is integrated across the curriculum, and the school believes "that a return to classical methodology in the context of a Christ-filled community is the most effective way to form the human person in the modern world."

Learning Services
In 2016, the school established the St. Ambrose Academy Reading Institute to assist Catholic school students with dyslexia. This program became the independent Learning Atrium in 2020. The school continues to enlist the services of the Learning Atrium to support students with varying learning styles. The school has also expanded its own Learning Services Department to better serve students and families.

References

External links

Roman Catholic Diocese of Madison
Educational institutions established in 2003
High schools in Madison, Wisconsin
Catholic secondary schools in Wisconsin
Education in Madison, Wisconsin
Schools in Dane County, Wisconsin
Private middle schools in Wisconsin
2003 establishments in Wisconsin